Steam World is a UK-based railway magazine mainly covering the British Railways steam era (1945–1968). It is published monthly by Steam World Publishing.

History and profile
Steam World was founded in 1981. The magazine ceased publication following its issue 23 in 1983. It was reestablished in 1990.

Parameters
 Size      = A4
 Issue     = No. 361 is July 2017

ISSN

See also
 List of railroad-related periodicals

References

External links
 Official website

Monthly magazines published in the United Kingdom
Magazines established in 1981
Rail transport magazines published in the United Kingdom